Luca Puccinelli (born 11 July 1973 in Viareggio, Province of Lucca) is an Italian retired footballer and agent. He played as a midfielder. After playing in Sampdoria youth teams he played mainly in Serie C1 and Serie C2. During his career he had to face many injuries that in the end forced him to retire from football. Nowadays he is an important football agent and he assists many successful players including Alessandro Diamanti, Alberto Gilardino, Aleandro Rosi and Nicolao Dumitru.
He was born in Viareggio but he travelled a lot during his life because of his career. He is married and has two children.

Career
1992-1994  Viareggio 20 (5) 
1994-1996  Empoli 48 (5) 
1996-1998  Siena 44 (3) 
1998-2000  Palermo 45 (5) 
2000-2001  Savoia 22 (0) 
2001-2002  Pescara 19 (2) 
2003-2004  Brindisi 32 (5) 
2004  Torres 9 (0) 
2004-2005  Novara 21 (0) 
2005-2006  Perugia 21 (0)

External links
 
 

1973 births
Living people
People from Viareggio
Italian footballers
Association football midfielders
Sportspeople from the Province of Lucca
Footballers from Tuscany
Association football agents